Alberta Originals: Stories of Albertans Who Made a Difference, originally published by Fifth House under , is a book of short biographical profiles written by Irish-Canadian author Brian Brennan. It's a sequel to Building a Province: 60 Alberta Lives, which Brennan published a year earlier.

Contents
The profiled Albertans include the following:
 The Famous Five:
 Henrietta Muir Edwards
 Louise McKinney
 Emily Murphy
 Irene Parlby
 Nellie McClung
 Frank Oliver
 The Big Four
 Patrick Burns
 George Lane
 Archibald J. McLean
 Alfred Ernest Cross
 Sir Frederick Haultain
 Henry Frank Lawrence
 Bill Herron
 Ho Lem
 William Aberhart
 Maude Riley
 Martin Holdom
 Monica Hopkins
 William Irvine
 Morris Cohen
 Karl Clark
 Elizabeth Sterling Haynes
 Gladys McKelvie Egbert
 Lizzie Rummel
 Norma Piper Pocaterra
 Annora Brown
 Llewellyn May Jones
 Punch Dickins
 Frank McMahon
 Francis Winspear
 Catherine Robb Whyte
 Eva Reid
 Herman Linder
 Betty Pedersen
 Ernest Manning
 Christine Meikle
 Pearl Borgal
 Bob Simpson
 Lillian Knupp
 Max Bell
 David Lander
 William Hawrelak
 Bruno Engler
 Ruth Carse
 Scotty Munro
 Mac Coleman
 Joe Shoctor
 J. Patrick O'Callaghan
 Ralph T. Scurfield
 Eugene Steinhauer
 Jimmy Fitzsimmons
 Violet King Henry
 Les Kimber
 Joe Kryczka
 Harold Hanen
 Ray Lowry
 Winnie Tomm
 Sandra Botting
 Irma Parhad
 Nelson Small Legs Jr.

References

External links
 Library holdings of Alberta Originals

2001 non-fiction books
History of Alberta
Canadian biographies